Santiago Hidalgo Massa (born 17 February 2005) is an Argentine footballer currently playing as a forward for Independiente.

Club career
Hidalgo had a brief spell with San Lorenzo, before joining Independiente at the age of eleven.

In September 2022, he was named by English newspaper The Guardian as one of the best players born in 2005 worldwide.

Career statistics

Club

References

2005 births
Living people
People from Santiago del Estero
Argentine footballers
Argentina youth international footballers
Association football forwards
Argentine Primera División players
San Lorenzo de Almagro footballers
Club Atlético Independiente footballers